Payasspor, formerly Payas Belediyespor 1975, is a football club located in Payas near Hatay, southern Turkey.

League participations
TFF Third League: 2013–present
Turkish Regional Amateur League: 2011–2013

League performances

Source: TFF: Payas Belediyespor 1975

Current squad
 2013/2014 squad.
Last update: 29 Mart 2014

Stadium
Currently the team plays at the 5000 capacity Payas Stadium

Other departments

Payas Belediyespor 1975 has also a men's volleyball team competing in the second-level of Turkish Men's Volleyball League.

References

External links
Payasspor on TFF.org

TFF Third League clubs
Football clubs in Hatay
Association football clubs established in 1975
1975 establishments in Turkey